Buy Me a Boat is the debut album of American country music singer Chris Janson. The album was released on October 30, 2015. It features the singles "Buy Me a Boat", "Power of Positive Drinkin'" and "Holdin' Her".

Critical reception

Stephen Thomas Erlewine of Allmusic wrote that "if [the title track's] accompanying album isn't quite up to its standards, it's nevertheless the work of an accomplished writer who knows how to sculpt a song for a wide audience. If Buy Me a Boat can be faulted, it's because its diversity often plays like a demo tape, with Janson crafting songs for any possible contemporary country audience."

Commercial performance
The album debuted at No. 4 on the Top Country Albums chart, and No. 18 on the Billboard 200, selling 18,536 copies in its first week. The album has sold 117,100 copies in the US as of March 2017.

Track listing

Personnel
Adapted from Buy Me a Boat liner notes.

Musicians
Brent Anderson - acoustic guitar (all tracks except 4), background vocals (all tracks except 3), synthesizer (2), bouzouki (11)
David Dorn - Hammond B-3 organ (2, 7, 11), keyboards (2, 3, 4, 5, 6, 9, 10), synthesizer (7), piano (8), Wurlitzer electric piano (11)
Shannon Forrest - drums (4, 5, 9), programming (9)
Byron Gallimore - acoustic guitar (9)
Chris Janson - lead vocals (all tracks), acoustic guitar (4), harmonica (8)
Troy Lancaster - electric guitar (3, 4, 5, 6, 9, 10)
Tony Lucido - bass guitar (all tracks)
Fred Newell - steel guitar (3, 6, 8, 10)
Justin Ostrander - electric guitar (1, 2, 7, 11)
Russ Pahl - Jew's harp (7), steel guitar (8)
Ben Phillips - drums (except 4, 5, 9), programming (2, 7)
Jeff Roach - synthesizer (1, 2)
Justin Schipper - steel guitar (4, 5, 9)
Will Weatherly - programming (1, 2, 7)
Derek Wells - electric guitar (3, 6, 8, 10)

Technical
Tracks 1, 2, 7, 8, 11
 Brent Anderson - producer
 Jeff Balding - recording
 Matt Coles - assistant
 Chris DuBois - producer
 Chris Janson - producer
 Scott Johnson - production assistant
 Ben Phillips - recording, digital editing, mixing
 Will Weatherly - digital editing

Tracks 3-6, 9, 10
Stephen Allbritten - assistant (3, 4, 6, and 10 only)
Jake Burns - assistant (4, 5, and 9 only)
Byron Gallimore - producer, mixing
Julian King - recording
Erik Lutkins - additional recording (3, 4, 6, and 10 only)
Ernesto Olivera - assistant (3, 6, and 10 only)

All tracks
 Adam Ayan - mastering
Eric Brown - photography
Katherine Petillo - art direction, design
Shane Tarleton - creative director

Charts

Weekly charts

Year-end charts

Certifications

References

2015 debut albums
Chris Janson albums
Albums produced by Byron Gallimore
Warner Records albums